There are three lava flow areas in the American state of Arizona:

Bonito Lava Flow - (Map). The basalt lava flow extruded from the base of Sunset Crater around 1180. The flow surface consists of pahoehoe.
Kana-a Lava Flow - (Map)
Pinacate Lava Flow - (Map)

See also
San Francisco Volcanic Field

Volcanism of Arizona
Lava flows